Patriarch Sophronius I may refer to:

 Sophronius of Jerusalem, ruled in 634–638
 Patriarch Sophronius I of Alexandria, ruled in 841–860
 Sophronius I of Constantinople, ruled in 1463–1464